The Bargy Conglomerate is a geologic formation in Haute-Savoie region in France. It preserves fossils dating back to the Cretaceous period. It includes a high accumulation of phosphate materials with a rich microbial layer beneath which hoplitids and inoceramids are found.

See also

 List of fossiliferous stratigraphic units in France

References

 
 Wagreich;N. Hart; Sames; O. Yilmaz; B. Hart, M.;M.; B.; I.; M. (May 30, 2020). Cretaceous Climate Events and Short-term Sea-level Changes (London ed.). Geological Society of London. pp. 159–160. ISBN 1786204746.

Cretaceous France